The Hare Indian Formation is a geologic formation in Northwest Territories. It preserves fossils dating back to the Devonian period.

See also

 List of fossiliferous stratigraphic units in Northwest Territories

References
 

Devonian Northwest Territories
Devonian northern paleotropical deposits
Devonian southern paleotropical deposits